The National Indoor Soccer League (NISL) is an indoor soccer league that began play in 2021 and is based in the Southeast United States. The league fields men's and women's divisions. On March 24, 2021, the league announced its partnership with Nike.

On April 29, 2021, the Memphis Americans were officially announced as a charter team in the new NISL On June 7. 2021, the Fayetteville Fury were announced as the league's second team.  On August 17, 2021, the Columbus Rapids became the third franchise to join the league. On December 16, 2021, 10 days before the season opener, the Rome (Ga.) Gladiators, a travel team, became the fourth and final team to join the league for its inaugural season.

On July 7 it was announced that an expansion team was coming to Tampa.

Staff
 Andrew Haines – Executive Board of Directors
 Joshua Blair – Executive Board of Directors
 Jason Gibson – Executive Board of Directors
 Michael Taylor – Executive Board of Directors
 Donald Bunney – Creative Director

Teams

Current

On hiatus

Champions

References

External links 
 

Indoor soccer leagues in the United States
Sports leagues established in 2021
Professional sports leagues in the United States
2021 establishments in the United States